Sõmerpalu paisjärv is a lake in the parish of Sõmerpalu, in Estonia's Voru County which borders with both Latvia and Russia.

See also
List of lakes of Estonia

Reservoirs in Estonia
Võru Parish
Lakes of Võru County